Broadfields United Football Club is a football club based in Harrow, Greater London, England.

History
The club was established in 1993, and joined the Southern Olympian League. They were Division Four champions in 1994–95, after which they joined Division One of the Middlesex County League. The following season it was renamed the Senior Division, and Broadfields were champions, earning promotion to the Premier Division. Despite finishing bottom of the Premier Division in 1998–99, they were not relegated.

However, in 2003–04 the club finished bottom of the Premier Division again and subsequently left the league. They returned in 2007, joining Division One West. Despite finishing second-from-bottom of the division, they were promoted to the Premier Division for the 2008–09 season. They withdrew from the league towards the end of the 2009–10 season, resulting in their record being expunged, but returned to the Premier Division for the 2010–11 season.

In 2011–12 Broadfields won the Premier Division Cup, retaining it the following season. In 2014–15 they finished fourth in the Premier Division, allowing the club to be promoted to Division One of the Spartan South Midlands League. The club were Division One runners-up in 2018–19, earning promotion to the Premier Division.

Honours
Spartan South Midlands League Challenge Trophy
 Winners: 2017-18
Middlesex Premier Cup
 Winners: 2016–17, 2017–18
Middlesex County League
Senior Division Champions 1996–97
Alec Smith Premier Division Cup Winners 2011–12, 2012–13
Southern Olympian League
Division Four Champions 1994–95

Records
Best FA Cup performance: Second qualifying round, 2021–22
Best FA Vase performance: Second round, 2016–17

See also
Broadfields United F.C. players

References

External links

Football clubs in England
Football clubs in London
Sport in the London Borough of Harrow
Association football clubs established in 1993
1993 establishments in England
Middlesex County Football League
Spartan South Midlands Football League